Syria and Iran are strategic allies. Syria is usually called Iran's "closest ally", with ideological conflict between the Arab nationalism ideology of Syria's secular ruling Ba'ath Party and the Islamic Republic of Iran's pan-Islamist policy notwithstanding. Iran and Syria have had a strategic alliance ever since the Iran–Iraq War, when Syria sided with non-Arab Iran against neighbouring Ba'ath-ruled Iraq. The two countries shared a common animosity towards then Iraqi president Saddam Hussein and coordination against the United States and Israel.

Syria cooperates with Iran in sending arms to Palestinian groups including Hamas and Hezbollah in Lebanon. The United States, the United Kingdom and Canada have designated both Iran and Syria as State Sponsors of Terrorism in part due to support for Hezbollah.

During the Syrian Civil War, Iran conducted, alongside Russia, "an extensive, expensive, and integrated effort to keep Syrian President Bashar al-Assad in power." Iran, Syria, Iraq, and Russia also form an anti-terrorism alliance that has its headquarters in Baghdad.

In September 2022, Iranian state media reported that high-level officials from Iran and Syria discussed the prospects of "mutual cooperation in the field of oil and gas," suggesting that the two countries are considering forming a joint oil and gas company.

History and overview

Ancient History
In 539 BCE, Cyrus the Great, King of Achaemenid Persians, took Syria as part of his empire, to become known as Eber-Nari. The Persian rule lasted until Alexander the Great conquered the region in 333–332 BCE. Later on, Khosrow II of the Sasanian Empire managed to control the region including Syria from 609 to 628 AD.

Medieval History 
Buyid Iran and the Hamdanid Emirate of Syria and Jazira vied for dominance in the Middle East. The Iranians were able to expel the Hamdanids from Baghdad. By the end of the 10th century, Syria and Jazira were under Fatimid, Iranian, or Eastern Roman influence.

Iran under the Aq Qoyunlu and Syria under the Mamluk Sultanate continued to compete for Upper Mesoptamia until the Ottoman Empire took over.

Prior to 1979
Following the independence of Syria in 1946, Iran established a consulate in Syria. Until the Iranian Revolution in 1979, especially since the establishment of a Baathist regime in Iraq which was considered an enemy by both countries, the two countries have had favorable relations and cooperation despite different views of the ruling regimes. Important examples of such relations include the support of Iran for United Nations Security Council Resolution 316 urging Israel to free five Syrian officers captured in Lebanon, and Hafez al-Assad's four-day trip to Tehran in 1975 and the signing of cooperation agreements between the two countries.

However, after the improvement of Iran–Iraq relations in late 1970s, Hafiz al-Assad voiced support for Iranian dissidents, contacting opposition groups via their contacts abroad such as Mostafa Chamran and Musa al-Sadr and undertaking to train Iranian guerrillas.

1979–1990

Iran–Syria relations improved after the Iranian Revolution in 1979. Syria's strategic alliance with Egypt ended around the same time due to Egypt's treaty with Israel. Post-Revolution Iran represented an opportunity for Syrian President Hafez al-Assad to find a new counterweight to Israel and Iraq, Syria's regional foes. Meanwhile, the new Iranian leader Ayatollah Khomeini saw Syria as a conduit to the Shia community in Lebanon. Mostafa Chamran, a close adviser to Khomeini, had experience fighting in Lebanon and advocated an Iranian alliance with Assad to increase their influence in southern Lebanon.  As the grip of Alawite echelons in the Syrian Baath party tightened; Assad also pursued a close alliance with the Khomeinist theocracy of Iran during the 1980s.

The relationship between Iranian and Syrian governments has sometimes been described as the Axis of Resistance. Syria was the first Arab state and the third in general, after the Soviet Union and Pakistan, to recognize the Islamic Republic, founded in February 1979. Specifically Syria officially recognized the Islamic Republic on 12 February 1979. However, Assad did not visit Iran while Khomenei was alive, as the ayatollah did not consider Assad to be a true Muslim. The Syrian leadership, including the current president Bashar Assad himself, belongs predominantly to the Alawite branch of Shi'a Islam. However, the relations between the two countries do not depend on religious causes, because Syria is a secular state, while Iran is an Islamic republic. Instead, their ties are driven by common political and strategic points.

One of the first major fronts of the Iran–Syria alliance was Iraq. During the Iran–Iraq War, Syria sided with non-Arab Iran against Iraq and was isolated by Saudi Arabia and some of the Arab countries, with the exceptions of Libya, Lebanon, Algeria, Sudan and Oman. As one of Iran's few Arab allies during the war, Syria shut down an Iraqi oil pipeline (Kirkuk–Baniyas pipeline) to deprive the Iraqis of revenue. Syria also trained Iranians in missile technology and provided Iran with Scud B missiles between 1986 and 1988. In return for Syria's war support, Iran provided Syria with millions of free and discounted barrels of oil throughout the 1980s. In addition, Khomeini was restrained in his condemnation of the 1982 Hama massacre.

The second major area of cooperation between the two countries was in Lebanon during the Lebanese Civil War. Iran's Islamic Revolutionary Guard Corps, with Syrian assistance, established and trained the Hezbollah group to spread Khomeini's ideology and repel the 1982 Israeli invasion of southern Lebanon. Iran and Syria viewed Hezbollah as a useful lever against Israel and a way to establish greater influence in Lebanese affairs.

Iran and Syria had occasional differences in policy. In the mid-to-late 1980s, Syria maintained support for the non-Islamist Shia Amal Movement in Lebanon, even as Iran tried to maximize Hezbollah's power among Lebanese Shia. Although Iran was deeply ambivalent about the American-led intervention to remove Saddam Hussein from Kuwait, Syria participated in the coalition of nations to fight Iraq. Still, these disagreements never threatened to derail the relationship.

1990s–2000s
The alliance deepened in 2000 when Hafez's son Bashar al-Assad took over as President of Syria. Subsequent events like the Iraq War, the "Cedar Revolution", and the 2006 Lebanon War brought the countries closer together. Syria became increasingly dependent on Iran for political and military support, as Assad was unable to maintain positive ties with other Arab powers during this time.

On 16 June 2006, the defense ministers of Iran and Syria signed an agreement for military cooperation against what they called the "common threats" presented by Israel and the United States. Details of the agreement were not specified, however the Iranian defense minister Najjar said "Iran considers Syria's security its own security, and we consider our defense capabilities to be those of Syria." The visit also resulted in the sale of Iranian military hardware to Syria. In addition to receiving military hardware, Iran has consistently invested billions of dollars into the Syrian economy.

Currently, Iran is involved in implementing several industrial projects in Syria, including cement factories, car assembly lines, power plants, and silo construction. Iran also plans to set up a joint Iranian–Syrian bank in the future. On 17 February 2007, Presidents Ahmadinejad and Assad met in Tehran. Ahmadinejad afterwards declared that they would form an alliance to combat U.S. and Israeli conspiracies against the Islamic world.

Iran's President Hassan Rouhani stated on 3 August 2013, his inauguration day, that Iran's alliance with Syria would continue.

Syrian Civil War

During the Syrian Civil War since 2011, Iran has aided the Syrian government. The Guardian claimed that in May 2011 the Iranian Revolutionary Guard increased its "level of technical support and personnel support" to strengthen Syria's "ability to deal with protesters," according to one diplomat in Damascus. Iranian Sr. Foreign Policy Advisor Ali Akbar Velayati declared, "Iran is not prepared to lose this golden counterweight [to Israel]."

Iran reportedly assisted the Syrian government sending it riot control equipment, intelligence monitoring techniques and oil. It also agreed to fund a large military base at Latakia airport. The Daily Telegraph claimed in August 2011 that a former member of Syria's secret police reported "Iranian snipers" had been deployed in Syria to assist in the crackdown on protests. According to the U.S. government, Mohsen Chizari (the Quds Force's third-in-command) visited Syria to train security services to fight against the protestors.

In late June 2011, the Supreme Leader Ali Khamenei, stated in regards to the uprising: "In Syria, the hand of America and Israel is evident;" and in regards to the Syrian government: "Wherever a movement is Islamic, populist, and anti-American, we support it." Other Iranian officials have made similar pronouncements identifying the U.S. government as the origin of the uprising. However, in late August, the Iranian government gave its "first public sign" of concern over Syrian's handling of its crisis when foreign minister Ali Akbar Salehi issued a statement including the Syrian government in the list of states he urged to "answer to the demands of its people."

Syrian dissident and academic Murhaf Jouejati argues that Iran's contingency plan for its interests in Syria, in case the current pro-Iran government is overthrown, is to ethnically fragment the country in such a way that Iran could support an independent Alawite state.

Iran has been sending troops to fight in the Syrian Civil War. These troops have served in roles as advisors, security personnel, special forces, technicians, and frontline troops. Several high-ranking Iranian troops, including officers and generals, have been killed in combat in Syria. According to DW, Iran has been fighting against the factions in Syria, specifically the moderate and extremist factions, as well as I.S both directly and indirectly. According to some estimates, Iran controlled over 80,000 pro-Assad Shi'ite fighters in Syria.

In June 2017, Iran launched missiles into Syria, targeting Islamic State fighters in retaliation for Tehran terror attacks, which killed 18 people. According to Reuters reports, Iran has persisted several times that all foreign military forces without legal permission should respect Syria's territorial integrity and vacate the country.

On May 8, 2022, Syrian President Bashar al-Assad arrived in Iran for discussions with Supreme Leader Ayatollah Ali Khamenei.

In September 2022, Israeli defense minister Benny Gantz said Iran is using proxy facilities in Syria to develop advanced missile systems and distribute them to its regional allies. Gantz revealed a map of facilities including an advanced underground facility in Masyaf that he described as significantly dangerous to the region.

During the Syrian Civil War, Iran provided oil to Syria at subsidized prices. In January 2023, Iranian officials reportedly told Syria they would no longer be able to buy Iranian oil at below market prices.

Cultural relations
Iran opened its first cultural center in Syria in 1983, located in the Mazzeh neighborhood of Damascus. It was later moved into the heart of Damascus next to Martyrs' Square. The goals of the center include increasing cultural, scientific, and religious exchanges between the two countries, as well as being a forum for Iranian Islamic culture and Persian. The cultural center cooperates with four Syrian universities to encourage the teaching of the Persian language.

While Iran has shown an interest in spreading its culture to Syria, Syria has not been as motivated to spread its culture to Iran, as it is already common for Iranians to study Arabic. It was only in 2005 that Syria opened its first cultural center in Iran, which has become popular with Iranians seeking to improve their Arabic.

The largest cultural ties between Iran and Syria come from religious tourism. In 2008, 333,000 Iranians visited Syria as tourists, most of whom came to make religious pilgrimages to shrines like Sayida Zaynab and Sayida Ruqayya, both of which Iran has helped to renovate and expand. Likewise, Iran restored mausoleums in Raqqa (shrines of Uways al-Qarani and Ammar bin Yasir). According to Nadia von Maltzahn, the author of a book on cultural diplomacy between Syria and Iran, a large amount of religious tourism from Iran has given Syrians the idea that all Iranians are "religious, of modest background, and conservative, which did not persuade many Syrians to visit Iran."

See also
 Arab–Iran relations
 Axis of evil
 Iran-Iraq-Syria pipeline
 Iran–Lebanon relations
 Iranian involvement in the Syrian Civil War
 Iranians in Syria
 Shia crescent
 State Sponsors of Terrorism

References

External links

The Iran-Syria Nexus and its Implications for the Region: Hearing before the Subcommittee on the Middle East and North Africa of the Committee on Foreign Affairs, House of Representatives, One Hundred Thirteenth Congress, First Session, July 31, 2013

 
Syria
Bilateral relations of Syria